is a railway station in the city of Fukushima, Fukushima Prefecture, Japan operated by Fukushima Kōtsū

Lines

Station layout
Kamimatsukawa iStation has one side platform serving a single bi-directional track. It has a ticket window which is staffed in the morning and evening on weekdays and all day on holidays. At the station there is also a proof-of-departure ticket machine, a beverage vending machine, and a waiting room.

Adjacent stations

History
Kamimatsukawa Station was opened on January 10, 1964.

Surrounding area
Fukushima Dai-Ichi Hospital

See also
 List of railway stations in Japan

External links

   

Railway stations in Japan opened in 1964
Railway stations in Fukushima Prefecture
Fukushima Kōtsū Iizaka Line
Fukushima (city)